USNS Sgt. George Peterson (T-AK-248) was a US Maritime Administration (MARCOM) C1-M-AV1  type coastal cargo ship, originally planned as an . The contract for building was canceled by the Navy in August 1945. The ship, however, was completed as SS Coastal Guide. She was later acquired by the US Army, in 1948, and renamed USAT Sgt. George Peterson. She was reacquired by the Navy, in 1950, and placed in service by the Military Sea Transportation Service (MSTS) as USNS Sgt. George Peterson (T-AK-248). She remained with the Navy until struck in 1966. She was sold in 1971.

Construction
Sgt. George Peterson, originally projected as USS Washtenaw (AK-218), but built as Coastal Guide, was laid down under a MARCOM contract, MC hull 2172, on 9 March 1945 by the Leathem D. Smith Shipbuilding Company, Sturgeon Bay, Wisconsin; launched on 13 May 1945; sponsored by Mrs. L. R. Sanford; and delivered to the War Shipping Administration on 16 July 1945.

Service history
Subsequently, operated by the United Fruit Company and the Polaris Steamship Company, Inc., Coastal Guide was transferred to the US Army on 23 June 1948; renamed Sgt. George Peterson (AK-248). and operated by the Army Transportation Service (ATS).

She was transferred to the Navy in July 1950 and placed in service as USNS Sgt. George Peterson (T-AK-248). The cargo ship then commenced eight years of operations in the Gulf of Mexico, in the Caribbean, and along the southeastern seaboard of the United States for the Military Sea Transportation Service (MSTS). During that period, she interrupted her regular service only once—to carry supplies north to arctic stations in the summer of 1955.

Early in 1959, the AK was ordered inactivated; and, in March, she was placed out of service at New Orleans, Louisiana. At mid-month, she was towed to Mobile, Alabama, where, on the 27th, she was transferred to the US Maritime Administration (MARAD) and berthed with the National Defense Reserve Fleet. She remained in reserve at Mobile until sold for non-transportation use in December 1971.

Private service
On 15 December 1971, she was sold to John E. Marsh, Brooksville, Florida, for $41,000. She was sold under the condition that she wouldn't be used for transportation. She was converted into a private yacht and renamed Marsha Lynn.

In 1979 she was sold to TransAlaska Fisheries Corporation, a subsidiary of The 13th Regional Corporation, and renamed Al-Ind-Esk-A Sea. She was converted into a Fish Factory Ship. On 20 October 1982, she caught fire while undergoing repairs in Port Gardner, Everett, Washington. The owners collected a $14 million insurance claim.

The wreck is located at:

Notes 

Citations

Bibliography 

Online resources

External links

 

Ships built in Sturgeon Bay, Wisconsin
1945 ships
World War II auxiliary ships of the United States
Type C1-M ships
Merchant ships of the United States
Type C1-M ships of the United States Army
Alamosa-class cargo ships